Casalanguida is a comune and town in the Province of Chieti in the Abruzzo region of Italy.

The region produces distinctive olive oil and wine; and is served by Pescara International Airport.

There is one ATM at the Posta Banca; it services international transactions.

References

Cities and towns in Abruzzo